Vesna De Vinča (born Vesna Jugović, ; 1957) is a Serbian television author, journalist, writer, director, film and event producer.

Biography 
Since 1993, de Vinča has been the television program editor for the documentary program of the Serbian state TV network Radio Television of Serbia. Her television programs have been broadcast via RTS satellite, RTV Pink, and on BN TV and BN TV satellite in Bosnia and Herzegovina.

Since 2004 she has run a private company called De Vinca Production. She is the author of the book, Mandela's Code. From 2006, De Vinča was jury member on the ÉCU The European Independent Film Festival.

Education
She received her Ph.D. in communication from Megatrend University. Her doctoral thesis was entitled Exclusive TV Journalism. She also has a master's degree in economics from the University of Belgrade.

Interviews and documentaries
The television series Top Encounters (1993–2011) is a documentary program that features De Vinca interviewing notable people. Some of her guests on the program were Nelson Mandela, Elisabeth Murdoch, Muammar Gaddafi, Arthur C. Clarke, Paco Rabanne, Yassar Arafat, Simon Wiesenthal, Sirimavo Bandaranaike, Pablo Raptis, and Gina Lollobrigida.

De Vinca made other documentaries and short films including Hasid's Song, Tenge Njenge, Angels wear Prada, Serbia the Land of Roman Emperors, and The Cross of the Holy Land.

Other activities 
de Vinča is the creator of the "Serbia, the Land of Lilacs" project, established in 2007, and supported by royal families from Europe. Working with the Military and Hospitaller Order of Saint Lazarus of Jerusalem, she donated medical equipment to hospitals in Kraljevo and Slankamen in Serbia.

"Belgrade Calling! Save Christmas trees!" was an action supported by Mensa, the Olympic Committee of Serbia, and European Rotaract to save more than 2,000 trees.

As a general producer, de Vinca produced the Fashion Week in Greece in Thessalonica in 2007, 2008, and 2009, and Balkan Beauty Ambassador  international events in Porto Carras in Greece, working with FASHION TV.

Vesna is the author and producer of Serbia Fashion Day, a Serbian brand promoting Serbian designers, culture, and fashion.

She is the president of the Miss Serbia and Miss Montenegro organizations and owner of licenses for Miss World from owner Julia Morley and Miss Universe from owner Donald Trump.

Awards 

Nobel laureate Ivo Andric Academy Award. For the screenplays and the spectacles, she produced,  dedicated to  forgotten personalities and events  of  our past Vesna de Vinca was rewarded with:  Nobel laureate Ivo Andric Academy Award -  Special contribution to the Serbian Culture  for the artistic illumination of exceptional historical figures of the Serbian people.

International Lilac Society  - Annual award as author of the unique  project “ Serbia land of lilacs”.

Cultural and Education Association of Belgrade  -  the Charter for special  project "Serbia  land of lilacs",  to author  Vesna de Vinca and supporters:  HRH Prince Alexander of Yugoslavia, HRH Princess Barbara of Liechtenstein and Military and Hospitaller Order of Saint Lazarus of Jerusalem  led by HRH  Princ Sixte-Henri de Bourbon Parme

Captain Misa Anastasijevic  Association – “Award for the best idea 2008” - to the author of the  project  “Serbia land of lilacs”,  Vesna de Vinca.

References 

Living people
1957 births
Serbian journalists
Serbian producers
Serbian television personalities
Miss Serbia
University of Belgrade alumni
Beauty pageant owners
Megatrend University alumni